Joseph Nicholas Grayson (born 26 March 1999) is an English professional footballer who plays for Stockport County, on loan from Barrow, as a defender and midfielder.

Early and personal life
His father is Simon Grayson. He attended Moorland School.

Career

Blackburn Rovers
Grayson joined Blackburn Rovers in the 2014, turning professional in July 2017. He made his senior debut on 28 August 2018, in the EFL Cup, in a 4–1 home victory against Lincoln City. In doing so him and his father became the third father-son duo to both play for Blackburn Rovers.

He moved on loan to Grimsby Town in January 2019 for the rest of the season.

On 1 February 2021, Grayson joined League One side Oxford United on loan until the end of the season.

On 13 May 2021, Grayson announced on social media that he was being released by Rovers at the end of the 2020–21 season.

Barrow
On 23 June 2021, it was announced that Grayson would join League Two side Barrow on a two-year contract following his release from Blackburn.

Loan to Dundee 
On 9 August 2022, Grayson joined Scottish Championship side Dundee on a season-long loan. He made his debut 3 days later in a home win over Arbroath. Grayson scored his first goal for Dundee against Inverness Caledonian Thistle on 17 September 2022. On 18 January 2023, Grayson returned to his parent club after his loan was terminated.

Loan to Stockport County
On 1 February 2023, Grayson was confirmed to have joined Stockport County on loan until the end of the season, with the clubs having beaten the previous day's deadline.

Style of play
Grayson was described by Blackburn Rovers as "a classy left-footed midfielder with a great delivery from set-plays". He can also play as a defender, and Grimsby Town manager Michael Jolley described him as somebody who "is versatile to play in several different positions and adds further strength, balance and competition to our squad".

Career statistics

References

1999 births
Living people
English footballers
Blackburn Rovers F.C. players
Grimsby Town F.C. players
Oxford United F.C. players
Barrow A.F.C. players
Dundee F.C. players
Stockport County F.C. players
Association football defenders
Association football midfielders
English Football League players
Scottish Professional Football League players